Llanafan Fawr is a village and community and ecclesiastical parish in the former cantref of Buellt (Builth) and historic county of Brecknockshire in Wales. It is now part of Powys. The community includes the former parish of Llanfihangel Bryn Pabuan.

The former spa town of Llandrindod Wells is also close by.

Name
The village is also known simply as Llanafan or variantly spelled Llanafan-Fawr. In Welsh placenames, many smaller communities are named for their parish, having grown up around the local church. This name of the village honours its patron saint Afan. "" is the mutated form of the Welsh , meaning "big" or "great". The title distinguishes the community from the nearby Llanafan Fechan ("Little Llanafan"), although that village is now more often known as "Llanfechan".

History
Afan was a 6th-century saint supposedly related to the Cuneddan dynasty of Gwynedd. His relics are claimed by the local church, which commemorates him as a bishop, presumably over Brycheiniog but possibly only over the local parish. The c. 1300 inscription on the tomb reads: HIC IACET SANCTUS AVANUS EPISCOPUS. He was said to have been martyred on the banks of the Afon Chwefru during an attack by Irish pirates or Danes.

The Llanafan Fawr Agricultural Show is held on the third Sunday in September each year..

Notable people
 Marmaduke Gwynne (1691–1769), an early and influential Methodist convert. 
 T. Harri Jones (1921–1965), a Welsh poet and university lecturer, born at Cwm Crogau.

Governance
An electoral ward in the same name exists. The population of this ward at the 2011 census was 1,386.

Church of Saint Afan
The Church of Saint Afan has been rebuilt several times. The foot of the church-tower is the only part remaining of earlier construction, the rest being rebuilt in 1886. In the porch on the right-hand wall are several carved stones which date from the 7th to 9th centuries. Inside the church, to the left of the altar, is a single pillar stone incised with a Latin ring cross, dating from the 7th century. To the right is an ancient baptismal font of similar age.

There is a 2,200-year-old yew tree in the churchyard. The churchyard claims Saint Afan's relics and is also the burial place of Thomas Huet, who translated the Book of Revelation into the Welsh language in the 16th century. There is also a double gravestone unique in Britain, the left-hand inscription notes that its occupant was murdered and also bears the name of his murderer: John Price Who Was Murdered On The Darren Hill In This Parish By R Lewis April 21, 1826. Relatives of both murderer and victim still live locally.

Other notable sites
The Red Lion Inn is believed by some to date from at least 1188, when it was visited by Gerald of Wales. Local folklore maintains that, while staying at the inn, Gerald learned of the miracle whereby the Anglo-Norman lord Philip de Braose was struck blind and saw his hunting dogs go mad when he disrespectfully used  church as a makeshift hostel one night. He was told that his vision would only return if he resolved to leave his estates and fight in the Crusades. Some say his sight was restored upon his pledge but Gerald records that he traveled to the Holy Land and fought blind, where he was "immediately struck down by a blow from a sword and so ended his life with honour". From 1910 until 1991 the inn was kept by the Davies family. In 2004, the inn was advertised for sale for the first time in 300 years. Also that year, television cameras were employed at the inn to record the World Tippit Championships.

It was associated with the site of Saint Afan's supposed martyrdom at the hands of invaders. In the 1700s, it housed a Latin grammar school. Evans, the eighty-year-old son of the last vicar to reside there, Rev Thomas Watkin Evans, witnessed the collapse of the building, after which the house was abandoned. It was later used during the Second World War by the Home Guard for hand-grenade practice.

Gallery

References

External links
 Church of St Afan, Llanafan Fawr at CPAT Brecknockshire Churches Survey
 Llanafan-Fawr's entry in the 1868 National Gazetteer at GENUKI

Villages in Powys
Communities in Powys